Shaheed Benazir Bhutto University (SBBU) is a public university, established in 2009 with a presidential order. It is located at Sheringal in the Upper Dir District, Khyber Pakhtunkhwa, Pakistan. The university was established by upgrading the sub-campus having forestry department and phytochemistry laboratories of the university of Malakand. Ms Shazia Khushdil, Mr. Khansher, Ms, Shazia Ahmad and Mr Naveed Anjum were the pioneers of sub campus and the only forestry department was there along with UPS and college and a project on medicinal plant. Ms Shazia Khushdil and Ms Shazia Ahmad are the first women in the history of Dir upper who started university education at Dir upper. They really made the history as the place where women couldn't walk out without their males, they served there efficiently. This is because of them that  Later in 2009, it became shaheed benazir bhatto university sheringal Dir upper. Mr. Badshah Hussain was the first registrar and Dr Jahandar shah was its first vice Chancellor.The university provides degrees in various subjects including computer science, pharmacy, geology, forestry, chemistry, biotechnology.

History and background 
In 2001, University of Malakand was opened at Lower Dir district. But sensing the need of the people of Dir upper, the then Governor of Khyber Pakhtunkhwa, issued directives for the establishment of Campus-II of Malakand University at Sheringal on October 3, 2002. His Excellency General (Rt) Syed Iftikhar Hussain Shah formally inaugurated the campus-II to enable the people to get a better education at their doorstep.
Sheringal Campus became a full-fledged University "Shaheed Benazir Bhutto University" on 6 October 2009, under the Regulation 2009, recommended by his Excellencies, the Governor Khyber PakhtunKhwa and approved by the President of the Islamic Republic of Pakistan.

The university is located in Sheringal, administrative headquarter and business hub of the lush green valley of Dir Kohistan, on the bank of Panjkora river at a distance of about 35 km from Dir city and 25  km from the Chukiyatan bridge.

See also
 University of Malakand 
 Abdul Wali Khan University 
 Swat University 
 Kohat University of Science and Technology

References

External links 
Official website
Shaheed Benazir Bhutto University
Shaheed Mohtarma Benazir Bhutto Medical University - Ustaadali.com

2009 establishments in Pakistan
Educational institutions established in 2009
Public universities and colleges in Khyber Pakhtunkhwa
Upper Dir District
Memorials to Benazir Bhutto